Mario Margarito Jorolan de los Reyes (October 17, 1952 – January 27, 2018), simply known as Maryo J. de los Reyes, was a Filipino film and television director. He began his career in the 1970s.

Death
He died after suffering a heart attack on January 27, 2018, in Dipolog, Philippines, at the age of 65. He directed the pilot scenes of Hindi Ko Kayang Iwan Ka until his death, when he was replaced by Neal del Rosario.

Filmography

Film

Television

Awards

2004: Won the Crystal Bear for "Best Feature Film" for Magnifico during the Berlin International Film Festival
2004: Won Deutsches Kinderhilfswerk Grand Prix	for "Best Feature Film" for Magnifico during the Berlin International Film Festival
2004: Won the Special Jury Award for "International Competition" category for film Naglalayag at the Brussels International Independent Film Festival

Notes

External links
 

1952 births
2018 deaths
Filipino film directors
Filipino television directors
People from Santa Ana, Manila
GMA Network (company) people